Wu Yantong (Chinese: 無言通, known in Vietnam as Vô Ngôn Thông, 759?-826 C.E.) was a Chinese Buddhist monk influential in the propagation of Buddhism in Vietnam.

Biography 
Born into a wealthy family, upon coming of age he renounced that lifestyle for a monastic life and eventually realized satori or enlightenment.

Around 820 C.E., he crossed the border of southern China and arrived at Phù Đổng village to reside in the Kiến Sơ pagoda in Bắc Ninh, Northern Vietnam. There he founded the Vô Ngôn Thông Zen Sect utilizing bích quán or wall-contemplation to realize the ultimate reality of the nature of mind as practiced by the founder of Zen or C'han Buddhism, Bodhidharma, an Indian monk who introduced this form of Buddhism to China around 520 C.E.

References

826 deaths
Year of birth unknown
Year of birth uncertain